The 1962–63 season was the 7th season of the Liga Nacional de Baloncesto. Real Madrid won the title.

Teams and venues

First stage

Group A

League table

Group B

League table

Final stage

League table

Relegation playoffs

|}

Stats Leaders

Points

References

ACB.com 
Linguasport 

Liga Española de Baloncesto (1957–1983) seasons
1962–63 in Spanish basketball